I Brigade, Royal Field Artillery was a brigade of the Royal Field Artillery which served in the First World War.

It was composed of 13th, 67th and 69th Batteries, and on mobilisation in August 1914 was stationed at Edinburgh under Scottish Command. It was attached to 27th Infantry Division in October, when it was reformed to consist of 98th, 132nd and 133rd Batteries. In November, these were joined by 11th Battery from 15th Brigade, and in July 1916 133rd Battery was transferred to 129th Brigade and replaced with B/CXXIX (Howitzer) Battery, renamed D/I Battery. In December 1916, 98th Battery was disbanded, leaving a three-battery establishment.

It saw service with 27th Division throughout the war.

External links
Royal Field Artillery Brigades
27th Division order of battle
The British Army: 1914, Mark Conrad, 1996. (on archive.org)

Notes

References

Royal Field Artillery brigades
Artillery units and formations of World War I